William "Billy" Holmes (2 April 1779 – 26 January 1851) was an Irish Tory and Conservative politician in the United Kingdom in the early nineteenth century.  He was an MP for 28 years.

Life
He was born in County Sligo, the son of Thomas Holmes of Farmhill, a brewer, and his wife Anne Phibbs, daughter of Harlow Phibbs. He matriculated in 1795 at Trinity College, Dublin, but did not take a degree. Then an army officer, he was secretary to Sir Thomas Hislop, 1st Baronet with rank of captain in the West Indies, from 1803 to 1807.

Holmes served as party manager, and Chief Whip in the House of Commons from about 1818 until his seat (for the rotten borough of Haslemere) was abolished by the Great Reform Act of 1832.  He had also previously represented several other constituencies.  In the dedication to his novel The Member: An Autobiography (1832), the Scottish author John Galt pays sardonic tribute to his skillful dispensation of political patronage. After the Reform Act Holmes was out of the Commons for five years, but returned in 1837 as MP for Berwick-upon-Tweed.

Holmes was also Treasurer of the Ordnance from 1818 to 1831.

His wife was Helen Tew, Dowager Lady Stronge (1769–1852), widow of Sir James Stronge, 1st Baronet of Tynan Abbey, County Armagh, Ireland (1750–1804).

Holmes died in 1851 aged 71 and is buried in Brompton Cemetery, London.

References

Bibliography

External links 

1779 births
1851 deaths
Burials at Brompton Cemetery
UK MPs 1807–1812
UK MPs 1812–1818
UK MPs 1818–1820
UK MPs 1820–1826
UK MPs 1826–1830
UK MPs 1830–1831
UK MPs 1831–1832
UK MPs 1837–1841
Members of the Parliament of the United Kingdom for constituencies in Cornwall
Tory MPs (pre-1834)
Conservative Party (UK) MPs for English constituencies
Members of the Parliament of the United Kingdom for Totnes